These are the official results of the Women's long jump event at the 1994 European Championships in Helsinki, Finland, held at Helsinki Olympic Stadium on 11 and 12 August 1994. There were a total number of 25 participating athletes and two non-starters, with two qualifying groups.

Medalists

Results

Final
Held on 12 August

Qualification
Held on 11 August

Group A

Group B

Participation
According to an unofficial count, 25 athletes from 17 countries participated in the event.

 (1)
 (1)
 (1)
 (1)
 (1)
 (1)
 (1)
 (3)
 (1)
 (2)
 (1)
 (1)
 (3)
 (1)
 (1)
 (3)
 (2)

See also
 1990 Women's European Championships Long Jump (Split)
 1991 Women's World Championships Long Jump (Tokyo)
 1992 Women's Olympic Long Jump (Barcelona)
 1993 Women's World Championships Long Jump (Stuttgart)
 1995 Women's World Championships Long Jump (Gothenburg)
 1996 Women's Olympic Long Jump (Atlanta)
 1997 Women's World Championships Long Jump (Athens)
 1998 Women's European Championships Long Jump (Budapest)

References

 Results

Long jump
Long jump at the European Athletics Championships
1994 in women's athletics